Stelică Morcov (born 1 December 1951) is a retired light-heavyweight freestyle wrestler from Romania. He won bronze medals at the Summer Olympics and the European Wrestling Championships in 1976.

References

1951 births
Living people
People from Azuga
Olympic wrestlers of Romania
Wrestlers at the 1976 Summer Olympics
Romanian male sport wrestlers
Olympic bronze medalists for Romania
Olympic medalists in wrestling
Medalists at the 1976 Summer Olympics
European Wrestling Championships medalists
20th-century Romanian people